Farnborough is a village in south-eastern Greater London, England, and prior to 1965, in the historic county of Kent.

Suburban development following the Second World War resulted in the area becoming contiguous with the conurbation of London. The area has formed part of the London Borough of Bromley local authority district since the formation of the ceremonial county of Greater London for administrative purposes in 1965.

History

The village name derives from Fearnbiorginga, meaning a village among the ferns on the hill. Old records date from 862 when Ethelbert, King of Wessex, gave away 950 acres at Farnborough. The village was not included in the Domesday Book of 1086, but the manor existed in the Middle Ages and was held in the 13th century by Simon de Montfort.

The village evolved on the main road from London to Hastings which originally ran via Church Road and Old Hill (to the south of the village). 
The George pub existed in the 16th century and was used as a coaching inn. Coaches and horses were accommodated later. In 1639 a severe storm destroyed St Giles' Church –it was later rebuilt.

Farnborough formed a civil parish in the Ruxley hundred of Kent. In 1840 the parish was included in the Metropolitan Police District. It was part of the Bromley rural sanitary district and went on to form part of the Bromley Rural District from 1894 to 1934. The parish was abolished in 1934 as part of a county review order, following the Local Government Act 1929, and its area was split between the Municipal Borough of Bromley (3 acres) and Orpington Urban District (1,426 acres). The entire area has formed part of the London Borough of Bromley in Greater London since 1965. The population of the parish was as follows:

Suburban development occurred in the post-Second World War years, resulting in the former village becoming contiguous with the London conurbation, however Green Belt legislation prevented any further development southwards.

In film
On 1 May 1933, British Pathé released As Befits a Romany Queen. The subject was the funeral of Urania Boswell, wife of Levi Boswell, of Willow Walk, behind Princess Royal University Hospital, on 24 April. She was the last Queen of the Kent (England) Gypsies (Romani People). The film lasts just under two minutes, and follows the cortege into Saint Giles the Abbott Church, where the gravestone may still be found, very near to the war memorial.

Transport

Rail
The nearest National Rail station to Farnborough is Orpington, located 1.7 miles away.

Buses
Farnborough is served by London Buses routes 358 & R4. These connect it with areas including Beckenham, Bromley, Crystal Palace, Orpington & Penge.

Notable residents
 Steve Bennett (b. 1961) - football referee, born in Farnborough
 Urania Boswell aka 'Gypsy Lee' (d.1933) - local woman dubbed the Queen of the Kent gypsies
 Chris Cowdrey (b. 1957) - cricketer, born in Farnborough
 Nigel Farage (b. 1964) - politician, born in Farnborough
 James Hanratty (b. 1936) - murderer
 Ben Wallace (b. 1970) - politician, born in Farnborough

References

External links

 Farnborough Parish WEB Site

Areas of London
Districts of the London Borough of Bromley
Former civil parishes in the London Borough of Bromley